Richard Allen Garriott de Cayeux (né Garriott; born July 4, 1961) is an American video game developer, entrepreneur and private astronaut. Although both his parents were American, he maintains dual British and American citizenship by birth.

Garriott, who is the son of NASA astronaut Owen Garriott, was originally a game designer and programmer, and is now involved in a number of aspects of computer-game development. On October 12, 2008, Garriott flew aboard the Soyuz TMA-13 mission to the International Space Station as a space tourist, returning 12 days later aboard Soyuz TMA-12. He became the second space traveler, and first from the United States, to have a parent who was also a space traveler. During his ISS flight, he filmed a science fiction movie Apogee of Fear.

The creator of the Ultima game series, Garriott was involved in all games in the series, and directly supervised all eleven main installments, starting with 1979's Akalabeth: World of Doom and concluding with 1999's Ultima IX: Ascension; the series is considered influential, notably helping with establishing the computer role-playing game genre. He founded the video game development company Portalarium in 2009. He was CEO of Portalarium and creative director of Shroud of the Avatar: Forsaken Virtues until 2018 when he shed the title, later relinquishing all Shroud of the Avatar assets to Catnip Games in 2019.

He is currently co-leading the game development studio DeMeta.

Early life 
Richard Allen Garriott was born in Cambridge, England on 4 July 1961, to Helen Mary Garriott (1930–2017) and Owen Garriott, one of NASA's first scientist-astronauts (selected in NASA Astronaut Group 4), who flew on Skylab 3 and Space Shuttle mission STS-9. His parents had been high school sweethearts growing up in Enid, Oklahoma. Although both his parents were Americans, Garriott claims dual citizenship for both the United States and the United Kingdom by birth.

Garriott was raised in Nassau Bay, Texas from the age of about two months. Since his childhood, he had dreamed of becoming a NASA astronaut like his father. Eyesight problems discovered at the age of 13 blocked his ambition, however, so he instead came to focus on computer game development.

Garriott's "first real exposure to computers" occurred in 1975, during his freshman year at Clear Creek High School. In search of more experience than the single one-semester BASIC class the school offered, and as a fan of The Lord of the Rings and Dungeons & Dragons, Garriott convinced the school to let him create a self-directed course in programming. He used the course to create fantasy computer games on the school's teletype machine. Garriott later estimated that he wrote 28 computer fantasy games during high school.

One of Garriott's game pseudonyms is "British", a name he still uses for various gaming characters, including Ultima character Lord British and Tabula Rasa character General British. The name was given to him by his first Dungeons and Dragons friends because he was born in the UK.

Game design career 
Garriott began writing computer games in 1974. His first games were created on teletype terminals. The code was stored on paper tape spools, and the game was displayed as an ongoing print-out. In summer 1979, Garriott worked at a ComputerLand store where he first encountered Apple computers. Inspired by their video monitors with color graphics, he began to add perspective view to his own games. After he created Akalabeth for fun, the owner of the store convinced Garriott it might sell.  Garriott spent $200 printing copies of a manual and cover sheet that his mother had drawn, then put copies of the game in Ziploc bags, a common way to sell software at the time. Although Garriott sold fewer than a dozen copies at the store, one copy made it to California Pacific Computer Company, which signed a deal with him. The game sold over 30,000 copies, and Garriott received five dollars for each copy sold. The  he earned was three times his father's astronaut salary. Akalabeth is considered the first published computer role playing game.

Later that year, Garriott entered the University of Texas at Austin (UT). He joined the school's fencing team, and later, the Society for Creative Anachronism. He lived at home with his parents while attending university, and from there created Ultima I with his friend Ken Arnold.  Its cover, and those of several subsequently Garriott games, were painted by Denis Loubet, whose art Garriott discovered during a visit to Steve Jackson Games.

Garriott continued to develop the Ultima series of computer games in the early 1980s, eventually leaving UT to work on them full time. Originally programmed for the Apple II, the Ultima series later became available on several platforms. Ultima II was published by Sierra On-Line, as they were the only company that would agree to publish it in a box together with a printed cloth map. By the time he developed Ultima III, Garriott, together with his brother Robert, their father Owen and Chuck Bueche established their own video game publisher, Origin Systems, to handle publishing and distribution, in part due to controversy with Sierra over royalties for the PC port of Ultima II.

Garriott sold Origin Systems to Electronic Arts (EA)  in September 1992 for $30 million.  In 1997, he coined the term massively multiplayer online role-playing game (MMORPG), giving a new identity to the nascent genre previously known as graphical MUDs. In 1999 and 2000, EA canceled all of Origin's new development projects, including Privateer Online, and Harry Potter Online. Garriott resigned from the company and formed Destination Games in April 2000 with his brother and Starr Long (the producer of Ultima Online). Once Garriott's non-compete agreement with EA expired a year later, Destination partnered with NCsoft where Garriott acted as a producer and designer of MMORPGs. After that, he became the CEO of NCsoft Austin, also known as NC Interactive.

Tabula Rasa failed to generate much money during its initial release, despite its seven-year development period. On November 11, 2008, in an open letter on the Tabula Rasa website, Garriott announced his plans to leave NCsoft to pursue new interests sparked by his spaceflight experiences. Later, however, Garriott claimed that the letter was forged as a means of forcing him out of his position and that he had had no intention of leaving. Garriott reviewed and signed this announcement, but did not sign a resignation letter that had been drafted for him by NCSoft. On November 24, 2008, NCsoft announced that it planned to end the live service of Tabula Rasa. The servers shut down on February 28, 2009, after a period of free play from January 10 onward for existing account holders.

In July 2010, an Austin District Court awarded Garriott US$28 million in his lawsuit against NCsoft, finding that the company did not appropriately handle his departure in 2008. In October 2011, the United States Court of Appeals for the Fifth Circuit affirmed the judgment.

Garriott founded the company Portalarium in 2009, which developed Shroud of the Avatar: Forsaken Virtues, a spiritual successor to the Ultima series.  Garriott remarked that had they been able to secure the intellectual property rights to Ultima from EA, the game could have become Ultima Online 2. On March 8, 2013, Portalarium launched a Kickstarter campaign for Shroud of the Avatar: Forsaken Virtues. An early access version of the game was released on Steam in 2014, and the game was fully released in March 2018.

In April 2022 he announced he had begun working on a new fantasy MMO that uses NFT technology with long time contributor Todd Porter. In August 2022, the game was announced as Iron and Magic.

Space tourist 
In 1983, Softline reported that "Garriott wants to go into space but doesn't see it happening in the predictable future ... He has frequently joked with his father about stowing away on a spaceship, and recently his speculations have been sounding uncomfortably realistic". The income from the success of Garriott's video game career allowed him to pursue his interest in spaceflight.  After the sale of Origin Systems, he invested in Space Adventures and purchased a ticket to become the first private citizen to fly into space. Due to financial setbacks in 2001 after the dot-com bubble burst, however, he was forced to sell his seat to Dennis Tito.

Garriott then returned to creating games; once he had accumulated sufficient funds, he put down another non-refundable deposit. During his mandatory medical examination a hemangioma was discovered on his liver, which could cause potentially fatal internal bleeding in the event of a rapid spacecraft depressurization. Given the choice of forfeiting his deposit or undergoing surgical removal of the angioma, he decided to have the surgery.

On September 28, 2007, Space Adventures announced that Garriott would fly to the International Space Station in October 2008 as a self-funded space tourist at a reported cost of $30 million.  On October 12, 2008, after a year of training in Russia, Garriott became the second second-generation space traveler (after Sergei Volkov), the first offspring of an American astronaut to go into space, and the second person to wear the British Union flag in space.  His father, Owen Garriott, was at the Baikonur Cosmodrome in Kazakhstan for the launch, and was in attendance when he landed safely, along with Russian cosmonauts Sergei Volkov and Oleg Kononenko, twelve days later.

During his spaceflight, Garriott took part in several education outreach efforts. The free Metro newspaper in London provided him with a special edition containing details of British primary school students' space experiment concepts that Garriott took to the ISS. The Metro has claimed, as a result, that it was the first newspaper in space. He communicated with students and other Amateur Radio operators and transmitted photographs using the Amateur Radio on the International Space Station (ARISS) slow-scan television system, and placed a geocache while aboard the ISS.

Garriott worked with the Windows on Earth project, which provides an interactive, virtual view of Earth as seen from the ISS. Garriott used Windows on Earth software to assist in the selection of locations on Earth to photograph, and the public were able to use the same online tool to track the ISS and see the view Garriott was experiencing. Garriott's photographs, along with images taken by his astronaut father Owen Garriott in 1973, will be available to the public through Windows on Earth, adding a personal element to studies of Earth and how Earth has changed over time.

Garriott covertly smuggled a portion of the ashes of Star Trek actor James Doohan on a laminated card, which he placed under the floor cladding of the ISS's Columbus module. This action was kept secret until Christmas Day 2020 when Doohan's son made the fact public on his Twitter account. At the time of the reveal, Doohan's ashes had orbited the Earth more than 70,000 times and traveled more than 1.7 billion miles.

Garriott's film Apogee of Fear was the first ever fictional (short) film fully filmed in space (whereas Return from Orbit was only partially filmed in space).  Tracy Hickman wrote the screenplay.

In 2010 he was featured in a documentary, Man on a Mission: Richard Garriott's Road to the Stars, which covered his spaceflight training and mission into orbit.

Other exploration 

In January 2021, Garriott was elected president of the Explorers Club.
 
In February 2021, Garriott traveled to the bottom of the Mariana Trench, the deepest oceanic trench on the planet. While there, as well as performing scientific duties, he placed a geocache, and recorded another short sci-fi film. This made him the holder of both altitude and depth records for these activities.

Other accomplishments and interests 
In 1986, Garriott helped start the Challenger Center for Space Science Education with his high school science teacher, June Scobee Rodgers, widow of Challenger Shuttle Commander Dick Scobee, who piloted the ill-fated STS-51-L mission. Scobee Rodgers drew on Garriott's early leadership in gaming to help design what have become approximately 50 global interactive networked facilities, where students perform simulated space missions.

Garriott bought the Luna 21 lander and the Lunokhod 2 rover (both currently on the lunar surface) from the Lavochkin Association for $68,500 in December 1993 at a Sotheby's auction in New York. (The catalog incorrectly lists lot 68A as Luna 17/Lunokhod 1.) Garriott notes that while UN treaties ban governmental ownership of property on other celestial bodies, corporations and private citizens retain such rights. Lunokhod 2 is still in use, with mirrors aligned to reflect lasers such that precise Earth-Moon distances can be measured. With his vehicle still in use, Garriott claims property rights to the territory surveyed by Lunokhod 2. This may be the first valid claim for private ownership of extraterrestrial territory. Lunokhod 2 held the record for distance traveled on the surface of another planetary body until it was surpassed by NASA's Opportunity Rover in 2014.

From 1988 through 1994 Garriott built a haunted house/museum every other year at Britannia Manor, his residence in Austin, Texas. Garriott's haunted houses cost tens of thousands of dollars to create each year and took many months and a sizable team to construct, yet were free to the public.

Garriott promotes private space flight and served as vice-chairman of the board of directors for Space Adventures. He is also a trustee of the X PRIZE Foundation.

Garriott participated in the first zero gravity wedding on June 20, 2009, with his wife Laetitia Garriott de Cayeux. The wedding took place in a specially modified Boeing 727-200 aircraft, G-Force One, operated by a company Garriott co-founded, Zero Gravity Corporation.

Garriott wrote a memoir (with David Fisher) covering his accomplishments in games publishing and spaceflight, entitled Explore/Create: My Life in Pursuit of New Frontiers, Hidden Worlds, and the Creative Spark. It was published on January 10, 2017.

Garriott was the inspiration for the character James Halliday in Ernest Cline's Ready Player One.

Awards 
 Garriott was named Ernst & Young Entrepreneur of the Year Award in 1992.
 Garriott became the ninth inductee into the Academy of Interactive Arts and Sciences' Hall of Fame in 2006.
 Garriott became the sixth recipient of the Game Developers Choice Lifetime Achievement Award in 2006.
 Garriott received the British Interplanetary Society's Sir Arthur Clarke Award for Best Individual Achievement in 2009.
 Garriott received the British Interplanetary Society's Astronaut Pin given to British-born astronauts in 2009.
 Garriott was inducted into the Environmental Hall of Fame in 2010.

Games

See also
 List of people who descended to Challenger Deep

References

External links 

 
 
 Windows on Earth

American video game designers
British video game designers
Video game businesspeople
Video game producers
Video game programmers
1961 births
Living people
Academy of Interactive Arts & Sciences Hall of Fame inductees
American technology company founders
Origin Systems people
Amateur radio people
American astronauts
British astronauts
Space tourists
Ultima (series)
People from Austin, Texas
People from Cambridge
People from Houston
University of Texas at Austin alumni
British people of American descent
20th-century American engineers
21st-century American engineers
21st-century British engineers
Game Developers Conference Lifetime Achievement Award recipients